Spezzano may refer to several Italian places:

Spezzano Albanese, a municipality in the Province of Cosenza
Spezzano della Sila, a municipality in the Province of Cosenza
Spezzano Piccolo, a frazione of Casali del Manco in the Province of Cosenza
 Spezzano, a frazione of Fiorano Modenese, in the province of Modena